Yoshino may refer to:

 Yoshino cherry, another name for Prunus × yedoensis, a flowering cherry tree
 Japanese cruiser Yoshino, a protected cruiser of the Imperial Japanese Navy

Places 
 Yoshino, Nara, a town located in Yoshino District, Nara Prefecture, Japan
 Yoshino, Nan'yō, Yamagata, a small town in the north of Nanyo, Yamagata Prefecture, Japan
 Yoshino, Tokushima, a former town located in Itano District, Tokushima, Japan
 Yoshino District, Nara, a district located in Nara Prefecture, Japan
 Yoshino-Kumano National Park, a Japanese national park comprising areas of Mie, Nara, and Wakayama Prefectures
 Yoshino Mikumari Shrine, a Shinto shrine located on Mount Yoshino
 Yoshino Mountain, a mountain located in the town of Yoshino in Nara Prefecture
 Yoshino Province, an old province of Japan
 Yoshino River, a river on the island of Shikoku, Japan
 Yoshino Shrine, a Shinto shrine in Yoshino District, Nara Prefecture, Japan

People

Surname 
, Japanese chemist
, tanka poet in Shōwa period Japan
, Japanese poet
, Japanese voice actor affiliated with Sigma Seven
, Japanese screenwriter
 Hiroyuki Yoshino, former national Japanese champion and early member of the All Japan Kickboxing Federation
, Japanese singer, performer and actor
, Japanese former footballer
, Japanese photographer
 Kenji Yoshino (born 1969), American legal scholar and essayist
 Kimi Yoshino, American journalist
, Japanese actress and gravure idol
, Japanese football player
, Japanese professional baseball pitcher
, Japanese professional wrestler
, Japanese physical geographer and climatologist
, Japanese politician and member of the House of Representatives in the Diet
, Japanese keyboard player
, Japanese sprint canoer 
, Japanese rower
, Japanese historian, writer and professor of political science
 Sally Yoshino (born 1978), Japanese striptease dancer, model, and former AV idol
, Japanese actress, model, and television personality 
, government member in the Empire of Japan and in post-war Japan
, Japanese professional boxer
, Japanese boxer
, Japanese football player
, Japanese professional wrestler 
, Japanese sprinter
, Japanese first female president of RENGO
, Japanese former football player
, Japanese rugby union player
, Japanese discus thrower
, Japanese composer of video-game music
, Japanese actress 
, Japanese footballer

Given name 
 (born 1971), Japanese video game composer
, Japanese voice actress
, Japanese ice hockey player
 (born 1976), Japanese actress
 Yoshino Mabuchi (born 1966), a retired Japanese diver who won bronze medals at the 1982 Asian Games
 (born 1999), Japanese professional footballer
 (born 1984), Japanese voice actress
Yoshino Nishide (born 1955), Japanese diver
 (born 1947), Japanese voice actress
 (born 1944), Japanese photojournalist
 (born 1963), Japanese voice actress

Fictional characters 
 Sakura Yoshino, a character from the Da capo visual novel
 Yoshino Somei, a character from the manga Spriggan
 Yusuke Yoshino, a character from the anime/manga/visual novel Clannad
 Yoshino, a character in Bleach (manga)
 Yoshino Naganohara, a character from the anime and manga series Nichijou
 Yoshino Takatsuki, a character in the Wandering Son manga
 Yoshino Nara, a character in the anime/manga Naruto
 Yoshino Fujieda, a character in the anime Digimon Savers
 Yoshino Yorita, a character in The Idolmaster Cinderella Girls series
 Yoshino Takigawa, a character in the anime/manga Blast of Tempest
 Yoshino, a character in the Date A Live series

Japanese feminine given names
Japanese-language surnames